The year 2003 is the 3rd year in the history of the Maximum Fighting Championship, a mixed martial arts promotion based in Canada. In 2003 Maximum Fighting Championship held 2 events beginning with, MFC 6: Road To Gold.

Events list

MFC 6: Road To Gold

MFC 6: Road To Gold was an event held on February 22, 2003 at Exhibition Park in Lethbridge, Alberta, Canada.

Results

MFC 7: Undisputed

MFC 7: Undisputed was an event held on May 31, 2003 at The Arctic Ice Centre in Slave Lake, Alberta, Canada.

Results

See also 
 Maximum Fighting Championship
 List of Maximum Fighting Championship events

References

Maximum Fighting Championship events
2003 in mixed martial arts